Ekblad Glacier is a glacier,  long, flowing from the eastern slopes of the Holland Range into Wise Bay, Ross Ice Shelf. It was named by the Advisory Committee on Antarctic Names for A. Ekblad, Master of the USNS Wyandot during U.S. Navy Operation Deepfreeze, 1964 and 1965.

References 

Glaciers of Shackleton Coast